Rank comparison chart of air forces of Commonwealth of Nations states.

Enlisted

See also
Comparative air force officer ranks of the Commonwealth
Ranks and insignia of NATO air forces officers

References

Air force ranks
 
Military comparisons